Willy Reynders (born 16 April 1954) is a Belgian football manager.

References

1954 births
Living people
Belgian football managers
K.V. Mechelen managers
K.S.C. Lokeren Oost-Vlaanderen managers
Sint-Truidense V.V. managers